Nikolaos Kourtidis (born April 1, 1986) is a Greek weightlifter of Georgian origin. At age eighteen, Kourtidis made his official debut for the 2004 Summer Olympics in Athens, representing the host nation Greece. He successfully lifted 377.5 kg in the men's middle-heavyweight category (94 kg), finishing in eleventh place.

At the 2008 Summer Olympics in Beijing, Kourtidis competed this time for the men's heavyweight category (105 kg). He placed ninth in this event, as he successfully lifted 176 kg in the single-motion snatch, and hoisted 221 kg in a two-part, shoulder-to-overhead clean and jerk, for a total of 397 kg.

In 2009 Kourtidis failed a doping test.

References

External links
NBC 2008 Olympics profile

Greek male weightlifters
Greek people of Georgian descent
1986 births
Living people
Olympic weightlifters of Greece
Weightlifters at the 2004 Summer Olympics
Weightlifters at the 2008 Summer Olympics
Doping cases in weightlifting
Greek sportspeople in doping cases
Mediterranean Games gold medalists for Greece
Mediterranean Games medalists in weightlifting
Competitors at the 2005 Mediterranean Games
Sportspeople from Kavala
21st-century Greek people